The former Breton and French diocese of Tréguier existed in Lower Brittany from about the sixth century, or later, to the French Revolution. Its see was at Tréguier, in the modern department of Côtes-d'Armor.

The title continues in the contemporary diocese of Saint-Brieuc and Tréguier.

History

St. Tudgual (Tugdual, Tudual), said to be the nephew of St. Brieuc (who had emigrated from Cardigan), was a bishop who came to Brittany from overseas (Scotland), and was appointed by his uncle Brieuc at the close of the fifth century as superior of the monastery of Tréguier, which Tudual had founded. The biography of St. Tudual, composed after the middle of the ninth century, relates that Tudual, wishing to confirm his authority by royal approval, travelled to the court of  King Childebert I, who ordered him consecrated Bishop of Tréguier.  Louis Duchesne, however, argued that it was King Nomenoe who, in the middle of the ninth century, had the monastery of Tréguier raised to the dignity of an episcopal see.

Numerous synods were held at Tréguier in the fourteenth and fifteenth centuries, and passed regulations for the discipline of the Breton churches.

Bishops

to 1400

c. 1032: Wiliam I.
c. 1045: Martin
c. 1086: Hugo I. de Saint-Pabutral
c. 1110–c. 1128: Raoul I.
c. 1150–c. 1175: William II.
1175–1179: Ives I Hougnon
1179–c. 1220: Geoffroi I. Loiz
c. 1224–c. 1237: Stephan 
c. 1238: Peter I.
1255–c. 1265: Hamon
c. 1266–c. 1271: Alain I. de Lezardrieu
c. 1284: Alain II. de Bruc
 1286–c. 1310: Geoffroi II. de Tournemine
c. 1317: Jean I. Rigaud
c. 1324: Pierre II. de l'Isle
1327–1330: Ives II. Le Prévôt de Bois Boëssel 
1330–1338: Alain III. de Haïloury
1339–c. 1345: Richard du Poirier 
c. 1354: Robert I. de Peynel
1355–1358: Hugues II. de Monstrelet 
1358–1362: Alain IV.
28 November 1362 – 1371: Even Bégaignon 
12 June 1372 – 1378: Jean II. Brun
1378–1383: Thibaud de Malestroit 
1383–1384: Hugues III. de Keroulay 
1385–3 May 1401: Pierre III. Morel

1400 to 1600

1401–1403: Ives III. Hirgouët
1404–1408: Bernard de Peyron 
1408–1416: Christophe I. d'Hauterive 
15. December 1417 – 1422: Matthieu du Kosker 
29. April 1422 – 1430: Jean III. de Bruc
1430–27. August 1435: Pierre IV. Piédru (or Predou) (also Bishop of Saint-Malo) 
1435–1441: Raoul II. Rolland 
4. May 1442 – 1453: Jean IV. de Plouec 
16. March 1454–23. September 1464: Jean V. de Coetquis 
8. January 1466 – 1479: Christophe II. du Châtel 
1480–1483: Cardinal Raphaël de Saint-Georges
1483–1502: Robert II. Guibé 
1502–7. March 1505: Jean VI. de Talhouët 
22 November 1505–16. November 1537: Antoine du Grignaux 
14 June 1538 – 1540 or 1541: Louis de Bourbon-Vendôme 
1541–1544: Cardinal Hippolyte d'Este 
1544–1545: Jean VII. de Rieux
8 June 1545 – 1547: François I. de Manaz 
1548–27. October 1566: Jean VIII. Juvénal des Ursins
1566–1572: Claude de Kernovenoy
1572–1583: Jean-Baptiste Le Gras 
1583–1593: François II. de La Tour
1593–29. October 1602: Guillace III. du Halgoët

1600 to 1800

1604–29. July 1616: Georges-Louet-Adrien d'Amboise
1616–1620: Pierre V. Cornullier
1620–14. September 1635: Gui Champion 
1636–19. August 1645: Noël des Landes' 
1646–1679: Balthasar Grangier de Liverdis 
1679–1686: François-Ignace de Baglion 
1686–15. May 1694: Eustache Le Sénéchal de Carcado (or Kercado) 
1694–1731: Olivier Jégou de Kervilio
1731–1745: François-Hyacinthe de La Fruglaye de Kervers 
1746–30. August 1761: Charles-Gui Le Borgne de Kermorvan 
1761–1766: Joseph-Dominique de Chaylus 
26. April 1767 – 1773: Jean-Marc de Royère
1773–1775: Jean-Augustin de Frétat de Sarra 
6 August 1775 – 1780: Jean-Baptiste-Joseph de Lubersac 
1780–1790 (1801): Augustin-René-Louis Le Mintier

See also 
 Catholic Church in France
 List of Catholic dioceses in France

References

Bibliography

Reference works
 pp. 641–642. (Use with caution; obsolete)
  (in Latin) p. 494.
 (in Latin) p. 254.
 p. 317.
 pp. 342.
 p. 387.
 pp. 413–414.

Studies

 second edition 

Treguier
1801 disestablishments in France